Readiness for enhanced therapeutic regimen management is a NANDA approved nursing diagnosis which is defined as "A pattern of regulating and integrating into daily living a program(s) for treatment of illness and its sequelae that is sufficient for meeting health-related goals and can be strengthened." It was introduced at the 15th NANDA conference in 2002.
Purpose:
This book is devoted to a discussion of nursing diagnoses, outcomes, and interventions for older persons. As such, the diagnoses selected for the volume are not exhaustive, but represent a severely underdeveloped knowledge base. We have chosen diagnoses that are most prevalent, most difficult to treat, and/or most in need of further development to inform practicing nurses and nursing students and to improve the quality of life of older persons.

Although most of the diagnoses included herein have been accepted for clinical testing by NANDA-I (NANDA, 2014), some are specific types of more general diagnoses; e.g., Risk for Poisoning: Drug Toxicity is viewed as a specific type of Risk for Injury. Other diagnoses that have not been approved by NANDA-I (e.g., Depression and Relocation Stress Syndrome) are included because they are frequent and difficult to manage problems that nurses encounter in older persons. Our intent is to expand the conceptual and operational development of the diagnoses, outcomes and interventions, and amplify discussion of their linkages to increase clinical usefulness and to promote further development and testing by nurse clinicians and researchers. The labels and content of the diagnoses, outcomes and interventions are consistent with those published by NANDA-I, NOC, and NIC unless otherwise indicated, or are compared with the published classifications with rationale provided for exceptions.

Structure:
The book is organized in eleven units, each representing one of Gordon's (1994) Functional Health Patterns. Most chapters within a unit are organized as follows, although there are some exceptions. Nursing-sensitive patient outcomes (NOC) are discussed before interventions. This is because in the sequence of clinical reasoning desired outcomes are identified prior to selection of interventions to achieve the outcomes. We allowed the authors some latitude in the organization of their chapters, however, overall there is substantial consistency of format.
Introduction
Presentation of the Nursing Diagnosis Concept
Significance of the Nursing Diagnosis for the Quality of Life of Older Persons
Prevalence in Older Persons
Assessment and Diagnosis
Case Study
Outcomes Sensitive to Nursing Intervention
Nursing Intervention Strategies
Continuation of Case Study
Supporting Evidence for the Nursing Interventions
Summary

See also
 Nursing Interventions Classification (NIC)
 Nursing Minimum Data Set (NMDS)

References

Nursing diagnoses